Dolní Loučky is a municipality and village in Brno-Country District in the South Moravian Region of the Czech Republic. It has about 1,300 inhabitants.

Administrative parts
The village of Střemchoví is an administrative part of Dolní Loučky.

Notable people
Antonín Mrkos (1918–1996), astronomer

Gallery

References

Villages in Brno-Country District